is a woman para-alpine skier, who won five medals for Japan at the 2018 Winter Paralympics. She also served as their flag-bearer at the 2018 Winter Paralympics Parade of Nations.

She won the gold medal in the women's downhill, women's Super-G, and women's giant slalom at the 2022 Winter Paralympics.

References

External links 
 

Alpine skiers at the 2014 Winter Paralympics
Alpine skiers at the 2018 Winter Paralympics
Alpine skiers at the 2022 Winter Paralympics
Paralympic alpine skiers of Japan
1997 births
Paralympic bronze medalists for Japan
Paralympic silver medalists for Japan
Paralympic gold medalists for Japan
Medalists at the 2018 Winter Paralympics
Medalists at the 2022 Winter Paralympics
Japanese female alpine skiers
Living people
People with paraplegia
Paralympic medalists in alpine skiing
21st-century Japanese women